Black Monster may refer to:
 Name of a character from the 1999 video game The Legend of Dragoon.
 One of the branding names of the Monster energy drink.